Damir Kedžo (born 24 May 1987) is a Croatian pop singer. While he started his career in 2003 by participating in Story Supernova Music Talents, he became even more famous in Croatia after winning the third season of Tvoje lice zvuči poznato, the Croatian version of Your Face Sounds Familiar. He also performed in musicals.

Life and career

1987–2002: Early life and education
Kedžo was born on 24 May 1987 in Omišalj, where he finished musical school, and was singing in a church choir. When he was a child, besides singing, he wanted to be a gynecologist, but he gave up on that idea when signed up for the Story Super Nova Music Talent Show. Damir had a jaw surgery, because he could not speak or eat normally, and he had problems with pronunciation of words, which was important for the profession he chose. After the surgery, he could not speak for a month, and the complete recovery took him three months, when he could chew normally again. He admitted that, after the surgery, he became a stronger person, and more confident in himself and his decisions.

2003–2005: Story Supernova Music Talents and Saša, Tin i Kedžo
In 2003, Kedžo auditioned for the first and only season of Nova TV's talent show Story Supernova Music Talents, where he excited the audience and the jury with his personality and attitude and his song interpretations which took him into the top 7. He was 16 at the time when he decided to compete in one of the most famous Croatian TV shows.

A year after, in January 2004, he became a part of the Croatian boy band "Saša, Tin i Kedžo" along with Saša Lozar (winner of the second season of Tvoje lice zvuči poznato) and Tin Samardžić. The band's debut album, titled Instant, sold 10,000 copies in its chart run, while their debut single "365" topped the Croatian charts for six weeks. In 2005 the band disbanded and Kedžo took a year off in his career.

2006–2009: Melodije Istre i Kvarnera and debut album
After he won an award at Melodije Istre i Kvarnera (MIK) for the best debuting artist with the song "Ki bi sad reke" in 2006 and the award for the best interpretation for the song "Kanet na vetru" in 2007, he has seen his path in pop songs with elements of Italian canzone. That was visible in his song "Odlučio sam otići".

2010–2014: Slavianski Bazaar, Dora 2011 and musicals
Damir has also appeared in Croatian performance of musical “Joseph and the Amazing Technicolor Dreamcoat” in double role, Benjamin and Potiphar. He had a great start in his acting career, he got awarded for great successes of young artists in operetta and musicals for the role of Hudi in musical "Crna kuća".

He debuted in 2006 on MIK with the song “Ki bi sad reke” and won the best debuting artist award. In 2007, on MIK, he won the award for the best interpretation with the song “Kanet na vetru” and the first place of the juries. In 2008 he published his debuting album with his most popular songs “Sjećam se”, “Idem” and “Kažnjen u duši”. A year later on MIK, he won the second place of the jury and third place of the audience with the song “Peza od zlata”. In 2010 on the international festival Slavianski Bazaar in Vitebsk, Belarus, he won the Grand Prix.

In 2011, Kedžo applied for Dora 2011, Croatian national selection for the Eurovision Song Contest 2011. In 2012, he won the best interpretation award on MIK with the song “Daj mi kapju vodi” and the first place of the juries. 2014 was a very successful year for Damir, he already sold two concerts in HKD Sušak.

2015–2019: Tvoje lice zvuči poznato and continued success
In 2015 he won on a Russian festival "New Wave". Since then, he started working on his songs in English. In 2016 Kedžo had one of his biggest concerts on International Women's Day in front of 3,500 people in Zamet Hall, Rijeka.

In December 2016, Kedžo won the third season of Tvoje lice zvuči poznato, the most watched Croatian TV show. After a wide spectre of enjoyed performances (Maurice White of Earth, Wind & Fire, Britney Spears, Petar Grašo, Doris Dragović), he claimed the victory of the show as Mariah Carey. In January 2019, Kedžo won Zagrebfest with the song "Srce mi umire za njom".

2020–present: Eurovision Song Contest 2020
On 23 December 2019, Kedžo was announced as one of the 16 participants in Dora 2020, the national contest in Croatia to select the country's Eurovision Song Contest 2020 entry, with the song "Divlji vjetre". He won the competition with a total of 31 points and was supposed to represent Croatia in Rotterdam. However, the event was cancelled due to the COVID-19 pandemic. He later was denied the opportunity to represent Croatia in the 2021 contest.

On 9 December 2022, Kedžo was announced as one of the 18 acts to perform in Dora 2023, which was held on 11 February 2023. He performed the song "Angels and Demons", and placed fifth.

Discography

Studio albums

Singles

Awards and nominations

References

External links

Croatian pop singers
1987 births
Living people
People from Primorje-Gorski Kotar County
Croatian folk-pop singers
Eurovision Song Contest entrants of 2020
Eurovision Song Contest entrants for Croatia
Slavianski Bazaar winners
New Wave winners
Your Face Sounds Familiar winners